Greece was represented by 4 athletes at the 1971 European Athletics Championships held in Helsinki, Finland.

Medals

References

http://www.sansimera.gr/articles/804

1971
1971 in Greek sport
Nations at the 1971 European Athletics Championships